The 2012–13 Xavier Musketeers men's basketball team represented Xavier University during the  2012-13 NCAA Division I men's basketball season. The team was coached by Chris Mack. The Musketeers competed in the Atlantic 10 Conference and played their home games at the Cintas Center. They finished the season 17–14, 9–7 in A-10 play to finish in a tie for sixth place. They lost in the first round of the A-10 tournament to Saint Joseph's. This was the first time since the 2004–05 season that Xavier failed to make the NCAA tournament.

The season marked Xavier's final season as a member of the A-10 as they departed to join the new Big East Conference in July 2013.

Previous season
The Musketeers finished the 2011–12 season with a record of 23–13, 10–6 in A-10 play finishing in a tie for third place. They lost to St. Bonaventure in the championship of the A-10 tournament. They received a bid to the NCAA tournament where they defeated Notre Dame and Lehigh before losing to Baylor in the Sweet Sixteen.

Roster

Departures

Schedule and results

|-
!colspan=9 style="background:#062252; color:#FFFFFF;"| Exhibition

|-
!colspan=9 style="background:#062252; color:#FFFFFF;"| Regular season

|-
!colspan=9 style="background:#062252; color:#FFFFFF;"| A-10 tournament

References

Xavier
Xavier Musketeers men's basketball seasons